Tropical Queensland is a region of the state of Queensland, Australia that lies north of latitude 23.5 degrees South in the tropical latitude.

It contains the Tropical North Queensland including the Far North Queensland, North Queensland and the Mackay Region as well as the Gulf Country in the west and parts of Central Queensland.

Except for the few major urban centres, such as Cairns, Townsville, Mackay and Mount Isa, these large tracts of land are largely undeveloped and have a low population density typical of remote, regional Australia. Much of the land is used for grazing; sugarcane is grown in the coastal areas where high rainfall occurs. Mining and tourism are the other significant industries in the region.

The region experiences cyclones mostly between the months of November and April.

See also

Regions of Queensland

References

External links
Rainforest Australia
Tropical Rainforest Places & Facts - North Queensland, Australia: Skyrail

 
Regions of Queensland
Northern Australia